Ballen is a surname. Notable people with the surname include:

Andrew Ballen (born 1973), American businessman and consumer advocate
Frederick Ballen (1843–1916), Union Army soldier and Medal of Honor recipient
Roger Ballen (born 1950), American photographer

See also
Balle (surname)